The Lahat railway station is a Malaysian train station on the northeastern side of and named after the town of Lahat, Kinta District, Perak, although prior to the Rawang-Ipoh Electrified Double Tracking project, the station has been converted into a freight yard. People living in Lahat will no longer get passenger services. The nearest passenger station is the Batu Gajah railway station.

Railway stations in Perak